Pieter Langedijk (born 10 February 1994) is a Dutch professional footballer who plays as a winger for IJsselmeervogels.

Career
Langedijk started his career with Sparta Rotterdam.

On 9 June 2021, he returned to the Netherlands and agreed to join IJsselmeervogels.

References

External links
 

1994 births
Living people
Footballers from Maassluis
Dutch footballers
Association football midfielders
Sparta Rotterdam players
RKC Waalwijk players
Go Ahead Eagles players
TOP Oss players
FK Pardubice players
IJsselmeervogels players
Eredivisie players
Eerste Divisie players
Czech First League players
Tweede Divisie players
Dutch expatriate footballers
Expatriate footballers in the Czech Republic
Dutch expatriate sportspeople in the Czech Republic